Sophien Kamoun  (born 8 December 1965) is a Tunisian biologist. He is a senior scientist at the Sainsbury Laboratory and professor of biology at the University of East Anglia (UEA). Kamoun is known for contributions to our understanding of plant diseases and plant immunity.

Early life and education
Kamoun grew up in Tunisia. He studied at the Pierre and Marie Curie University in Paris and then at the University of California, Davis where he obtained a PhD in 1991 for genetic analysis of pathogenicity of the bacteria, Xanthomonas campestris.

Research and career

Kamoun is known for his contributions to our understanding of plant diseases and plant immunity. He used genomics and molecular biology methods to obtain insights into the biology and evolution of eukaryotic plant pathogens. He discovered virulence effector families from plant pathogens and showed how they can modulate plant immunity. He demonstrated how antagonistic coevolution with host plants has impacted the architecture of pathogen genomes, accelerated the evolution of effector genes, and drove the emergence of immune receptor networks.

After his PhD, Kamoun worked at the National Science Foundation (NSF) Center for Engineering Plants for Resistance Against Pathogens at the University of California, Davis, and at the Department of Phytopathology (Wageningen University, Netherlands). He was on the faculty of the Department of Plant Pathology (Ohio State University, Wooster campus) from 1998 to 2007, before joining The Sainsbury Laboratory in 2007. He served as Head of The Sainsbury Laboratory from 2009 to 2014 and also holds the rank of professor of biology at the University of East Anglia. Kamoun served as president of the International Society for Molecular Plant-Microbe Interactions from 2012-2014.

Awards and honours 
Kamoun received several awards and recognitions. He received the 2003 Syngenta Award and the 2013 Noel Keen Award from the American Phytopathological Society, the Daiwa Adrian Prize in 2010, and the Kuwait Prize in 2016. He was elected a member of the Academia Europaea (MAE) in 2011, and the European Molecular Biology Organization (EMBO) in 2015. Kamoun won successive European Research Council (ERC) Advanced Investigator grants in 2011 and 2017. In 2018, he was elected a Fellow of the Royal Society (FRS) and he received the Linnean Medal for his outstanding contributions to plant science.

References

1965 births
Living people
Tunisian biologists
University of California, Davis alumni
Academics of the University of East Anglia
Members of the European Molecular Biology Organization
Pierre and Marie Curie University alumni
Fellows of the Royal Society
Linnean Medallists